The African wood owl (Strix woodfordii) or Woodford's owl, is a typical owl from the genus Strix in the family Strigidae which is widespread in sub-Saharan Africa.

Description
The African wood owl is a medium-sized owl which has the typical rounded head of the genus Strix similar to the Palearctic tawny owl or Holarctic great grey owl, with large dark eyes outlined by white eyebrows, and a white belly barred with brown. Overall, it has rich brown plumage with paler underparts, but it varies considerably across its range.

Voice
The typical song, like that of the tawny owl is a duet between the male and the female, the male makes a series of rapid, clear hoots, and the female answers with higher pitched, more leisurely hoots.

Distribution and subspecies
There are currently four recognised subspecies and they are named and distributed as follows:

Strix woodfordii woodfordii: southern Angola and southern Democratic Republic of the Congo, north to southwestern Tanzania, east to Botswana and South Africa.
Strix woodfordii nuchalis: Senegal and Gambia east to South Sudan, Uganda, the western Democratic Republic of the Congo, and northern Angola, also Bioko.
Strix woodfordii umbrina: Ethiopia and eastern South Sudan
Strix woodfordii nigricantior: southern Somalia to Kenya south to Tanzania including Zanzibar, and eastern Democratic Republic of the Congo.

Habits and ecology
It lives mainly in forest and woodland though it sometimes inhabits plantations. It is strictly nocturnal and eats mostly insects but will also eat reptiles, small mammals, and other birds which are mostly caught by swooping from a perch. It breeds from July to October and lays 1 to 3 eggs in a tree hollow, incubation starts with the first egg so that the young hatch asynchronously and if food is short then siblicide occurs. The eggs are incubated for about 31 days. Five weeks after the eggs hatch, the young will leave the nest and can fly two weeks later. The young will remain with the parents for about four months and will sometimes stay until the next breeding season. Its call is a loud series of fast hoots. During the day it roosts singly or in pairs in dense cover, high in trees, calling begins after dusk.

Taxonomy and naming
This owl and a number of Neotropical owls were placed in the genus Ciccaba but as they are doubtless closely related to Strix they are now treated as such. This owl is named after the British soldier of the Napoleonic Wars and naturalist Colonel E.J.A. Woodford.

References

External links
 (African) Wood Owl - Species text in The Atlas of Southern African Birds.

African wood owl
African wood owl
Birds of the Gulf of Guinea
African wood owl
African wood owl